Tabacco may refer to:
Antonello Tabacco (born 1990), Italian football defender
Patrick Tabacco (born 1974), French rugby player
Tabacco people, a First Nation in Ontario

See also
Tabaco, a city in Albay, Philippines
Tobacco, several plants in the genus Nicotiana
Tobacco (musician) (born Thomas Fec, 1980), American musician
Tabasco (disambiguation)